The Norway–Palestine relations are the bilateral relations between the Kingdom of Norway and the State of Palestine. Palestine has a diplomatic mission in Oslo, while Norway has a representative office in Al-Ram. Norway has not yet granted official diplomatic recognition to Palestine.

History 
The Labour Party, the ruling party at the time, held a pro-Israel position. For the majority of non-Socialist and Christians Norwegians, the new Jewish state represented the realization of the Prophecies of the Old Testament. Norway was described at the time as the most pro-Israel of the three Nordic countries. However, Labour's support for Israel was not indisputable, as in 1945 the party considered the establishment of a Jewish state to be "not possible and unfair". The party's proposal for the Jewish problem was non-Zionist, assimilating Jews into their respective European countries.

After Knut Frydenlund became foreign minister in 1973, he played a crucial role in promoting Palestinian demands early in his political career. However, in 1974, Norway was among eight states voting against granting the PLO observer status in the United Nations General Assembly.

Norway helped orchestrate the Oslo Accords. For the signing of the Oslo Accords, the Norwegian Nobel Committee awarded the 1994 Nobel Peace Prize.

To communicate better with the PLO headquarters in Tunis, Norway also established an embassy in the Tunisian capital.

In June 2022, the Norwegian government announced the start of labelling products from settlements following the EU approach.

References 

Palestine
Bilateral relations of the State of Palestine